Altufyevo is the northern terminus of the Serpukhovsko-Timiryazevskaya Line of the Moscow Metro, and the northernmost station of the entire system. It was opened in 1994. The station is shallow: its depth is 9 meters. Its name corresponds to the name of the city district. The station is quite busy, with over 70,000 passengers entering per day, due to being located in a densely populated region, and being one of the stations serving the satellite town of Dolgoprudny. The station has experienced leaks from the unsuitable soil in its location. Although it might not happen, reconstruction of the station will treat the leakage.

Moscow Metro stations
Railway stations in Russia opened in 1994
Serpukhovsko-Timiryazevskaya Line
Railway stations located underground in Russia